Sergei Isupov (born August 17, 1963) is a ceramic artist born in Stavropol, Russia now living in Cummington, Massachusetts, United States and Tallinn, Estonia. He was educated at the Ukrainian State Art School in Kiev and went on to graduate in 1990 from the Art Institute of Tallinn in Estonia with Bachelor of Arts and Master of Fine Arts degrees in ceramic art. He has since exhibited widely in both solo and group exhibitions, received numerous awards and widely collected by museums and private collectors.

Isupov's parents are both artists, his father, Vladimir, a painter and his mother, Nelli, a sculptor working in ceramics. His brother, Ilya, is a painter. Sergei emigrated to the United States in 1993.

Solo exhibitions

2018: Directions, Ferrin Contemporary, North Adams, MA
2017: Sergei Isupov: Selections from Hidden Messages, Ferrin Contemporary, North Adams, MA
2016: Sergei Isupov: Hidden Messages, Erie Art Museum, Erie, PA
2016: Head On, de Menil Gallery, Groton School, Groton, MA
2016: FIREFEST, STARworks, Star, NC
2015: Sergei Isupov, Kasher | Potamkin, New York, NY
2014: Promenade, Perimeter Gallery, Chicago, IL
2014: Collection Focus: Sergei Isupov, Racine Art Museum, Racine, WI
2014: New Work: Sergei Isupov, Perimeter Gallery, Chicago, IL
2014: Sergei Isupov, Ferrin Contemporary at Independent Art Projects, North Adams, MA
2014: Here and There, International Biennial of the Vallauris Institute, Hôtel de Ville, Vallauris, France
2014: Here and There, solo exhibition, HOP Gallery, Tallinn, Estonia
2013: Call of the Wild, Barry Friedman Gallery Ltd., New York, NY
2013: Here and There, HOP Gallery, Tallinn, Estonia
2010: He + She, Barry Friedman Ltd., New York, NY
2010: Firmly Standing, Estonian Museum of Applied Art and Design, Tallinn, Estonia

2009: Androgyny, Mesa Contemporary Arts Center, Mesa, Arizona, United States
2009: Androgyny: New Work by Sergei Isupov, Daum Museum of Contemporary Art, Sedalia, Missouri, United States
2008:Androgyny, Ferrin Gallery, Pittsfield, Massachusetts
2007: Ferrin Gallery, Lenox and Pittsfield, Massachusetts
2003: Ferrin Gallery, Lenox, Massachusetts
1995: It all started with tea, Connell Gallery, Atlanta, Georgia, United States
1995:Marta Hewett Gallery, Cincinnati, Ohio, United States
1993: Mosabaka Gallery, Helsinki, Finland
1993: Vasa Gallery, Falun, Sweden

Awards

2001: Louis Comfort Tiffany Biennial Award
1996: Smithsonian Craft Show Top Award for Excellence, Washington, DC
1993: Director’s Scholarship, six-week residency, International Ceramics Center, Kecskemet, Hungary
1991: “Best Young Estonian Artist” (under age 30) by the Union of Artists of Estonia Prize of the Ministry of Culture of Estonia

Collections

de Young Museum, San Francisco, CA
Fine Arts Museum of San Francisco, CA
Houston Museum of Art, Houston, TX
Mobile Museum of Art, Mobile, AB
Tallinn Museum of Applied Art, Estonia
Museum of Contemporary Ceramics, Summe, Ukraine
Museum fur Angewandte, Kunst, Frankfurt, Germany
Arizona State University (Art Museum), Tempe, AZ
Daum Museum of Contemporary Art, Sedalia, MO
Sparta Teapot Museum, Sparta, NC

Arkansas Arts Center, Littlerock, AR
Carnegie Museum of Art, Pittsburgh, PA
Everson Museum of Art, Syracuse, NY 
Fuller Craft Museum, Brockton, MA
Los Angeles County Museum of Art
Mint Museum of Craft & Design, Charlotte, NC
Museum of Fine Arts, Boston, MA
Racine Art Museum, Racine, WI
Estonian Museum of Applied Art and Design, Estonia
The Imperial Center for the Arts & Sciences, Rocky Mount, NC
Oslo Museum of Applied Art, Oslo, Norway
National Gallery of Australia, Canberra, Australia
Norwegian Museum of Art, Trondheim, Norway
Museum of Arts & Design, New York, NY
Museum of International Ceramics, Keckemet, Hungary	
Western Carolina University, Cullowhee, NC

References

1963 births
Living people
People from Stavropol
Russian ceramists
American ceramists
People from Cummington, Massachusetts